Kizylkumavis this is a genus of enantiornithine birds which lived during the Late Cretaceous and is known from fossils found in the Bissekty Formation of the Kyzyl Kum, Uzbekistan.

References 

Bissekty Formation
Euenantiornitheans
Fossils of Uzbekistan
Fossil taxa described in 1984
Late Cretaceous birds of Asia
Prehistoric bird genera
Turonian life